Anthony Kuhn is the National Public Radio correspondent in Seoul, South Korea.  He was previously NPR's correspondent in Beijing, China. Before his roles in South Korea and China, he served as NPR correspondent for Southeast Asia based in Jakarta, in which capacity he opened NPR's first bureau there, as well as in London. A graduate in French Literature at Washington University in St. Louis, he earned a graduate certificate in Chinese Studies from the Johns Hopkins University-Nanjing University Center for Chinese and American Studies in Nanjing, China. He attended high school at the Commonwealth School in Boston, Massachusetts.

Kuhn, who was NPR's correspondent in Beijing for years and reported on stories throughout China and the broader region, gained national attention in China when a video of him asking questions at a government press conference in fluent Mandarin became popular on the Chinese microblogging site Sina Weibo (China's answer to Twitter) in March 2017. On August 1, 2018, NPR announced Kuhn will become their next Seoul correspondent as Elise Hu will be moving to NPR West. 

He is the son of the late Harvard professor and preeminent sinologist Philip A. Kuhn.

References

External links
Official NPR biography

NPR personalities
Washington University in St. Louis alumni
Commonwealth School alumni
Johns Hopkins University alumni
Nanjing University alumni
Living people
Year of birth missing (living people)
American radio journalists